Joycelyn Harrison (born January 22, 1964) is an African-American engineer who is Associate Dean of the College of Aeronautics and Engineering at Kent State University. In 2006 she was awarded the NASA Outstanding Leadership Medal. Her research considers the development of novel piezoelectric materials.

Early life and education 
Harrison was born in Chattanooga, Tennessee. Her first job was washing people's hair in her mother's beauty salon. She attended North Chattanooga Junior High School where her teacher, Stu Silvernman, encouraged her to pursue a career in chemical engineering. She joined Spelman College as an undergraduate student, where she majored in chemical engineering. After earning her bachelor's degree, Harrison moved to Georgia Tech.

Research and career 
In 1994, Harrison joined the NASA Langley Research Center as a research engineer. At Langley she worked alongside Terry L. St. Clair on piezoelectric materials and electro-active polymers. By 1999 Harrison had been promoted to the Advanced Materials and Processing Branch. 

Harrison worked on Thin-Layer Composite-Unimorph Piezoelectric Driver and Sensor, THUNDER, a novel device that can detect changes in responsive smart materials. In particular, THUNDER could be applied to electronic systems, optical components and anywhere that needs noise or jitter suppression. THUNDER was awarded the Advantage Business Media R&D 100 Award. THUNDER was part of the NASA morphing programme, which looked to allow remote shaping of the surface of satellites.

In 2009 Harrison joined the Air Force Research Laboratory, where she worked on the low density materials programme. She was eventually made Director of the Budget Plans, and oversaw the United States Air Force $500 million research portfolio. Harrison joined Kent State University as Associate Dean for Research in the College of Aeronautics and Engineering.

Awards and honours 

 1998 National Women in Color Technology All-Star Award
 2000 Exceptional Achievement Medal
 2006 NASA Outstanding Leadership Medal
 2020 Dominion Energy and Library of Virginia “Strong Men and Women” in Virginia History honouree

Select publications

References 

1964 births
Living people
African-American engineers
African-American women academics
American women academics
African-American academics
Spelman College alumni
Georgia Tech alumni
NASA people
Kent State University faculty